Joseph Strauss (November 16, 1858 – June 24, 1906), was a professional baseball pitcher and outfielder in Major League Baseball from 1884 to 1886. He played for the Kansas City Cowboys, Brooklyn Grays, and Louisville Colonels.

See also
 List of Major League Baseball annual saves leaders

References

External links

1858 births
1906 deaths
Major League Baseball pitchers
Baseball players from Cincinnati
19th-century baseball players
Kansas City Cowboys (UA) players
Brooklyn Grays players
Louisville Colonels players
Columbus Stars (baseball) players
Milwaukee Cream Citys players
Milwaukee Brewers (minor league) players
Milwaukee Creams players
Omaha Omahogs players
Omaha Lambs players
Sioux City Corn Huskers players
Spokane Bunchgrassers players
Mobile Blackbirds players
Jacksonville Jacks players
Minneapolis Millers (baseball) players
Columbus Buckeyes (minor league) players
Columbus Senators players
Grand Rapids Bob-o-links players